Levan Dzhambulovich Dzharkava (born 29 March 1988) is a former Russian football player of Georgian descent.

Club career
He made his debut in the Russian Second Division for FC Chernomorets Novorossiysk on 22 August 2012 in a game against FC Astrakhan.

He made his Russian Football National League debut for FC Sakhalin Yuzhno-Sakhalinsk on 6 July 2014 in a game against FC Anzhi Makhachkala. He played one more season in the FNL for FC Torpedo Armavir.

References

External links
 Career summary by sportbox.ru

1988 births
Russian people of Georgian descent
Living people
Russian footballers
Association football midfielders
FC Chernomorets Novorossiysk players
FC Sakhalin Yuzhno-Sakhalinsk players
Ulisses FC players
FC Armavir players
Armenian Premier League players
Russian expatriate footballers
Expatriate footballers in Israel
Expatriate footballers in Armenia